Gevorg Hambardzumi Abajian (December 12, 1920, Shnogh village, Lori Province, Armenia - 2002, Yerevan) was an Armenian theatrical and literary critic. PhD on Philology (1956), awarded by the Renowned Activist of Armenian SSR Arts title in 1972.

Abajian was a World War II veteran. Starting in 1945 he was an artist of Gyumri Dramatic Theatre, then chief-editor of the cultural programs of Armenian SSR state TV-committee, the head of press-department of the Committee of Cultural Relations with Armenian diaspora. He is an author of many books, novels and articles.

Books
Suren Surenian, Yerevan, 1959
Isahak Alikhanian, Yerevan, 1967

Sources
Armenian Concise Encyclopedia, Ed. by acad. K. Khudaverdian, Yerevan, 1990, Vol. 1, p. 8

20th-century Armenian writers
1920 births
2002 deaths
Armenian male writers
People from Lori Province
Soviet writers
Soviet military personnel of World War II